Kotler is a Jewish surname and may refer to :
 
Rabbi Aharon Kotler was a prominent leader of Orthodox Judaism in Lithuania, and later the United States of America, where he built one of the first and largest yeshivas in the US.
Rabbi Malkiel Kotler is one of the Roshei Yeshiva, or Deans, of Beth Medrash Govoha in Lakewood, New Jersey. 
Oded Kotler (born 5 May 1937) is an Israeli actor and theater director.
Oshrat Kotler (born 25 July 1965) is an Israeli journalist and fiction author.
Philip Kotler (born 27 May 1931 in Chicago) is the S.C. Johnson & Son Distinguished Professor of International Marketing at the Kellogg School of Management at Northwestern University.
Robert Kotler, FACS, is an American plastic surgeon.
Rabbi Shlomo Nosson Kotler (1856-c. 1920) was an Orthodox rabbi and Talmudic scholar. 
Rabbi Shneur Kotler (1918 - 1982) was the son of the famed Talmudic scholar Rabbi Aharon Kotler.

See also 
 Kottler (disambiguation)
 Cotler

Jewish surnames
Yiddish-language surnames